Nicholas Plastino (born February 20, 1986) is a Canadian-born Italian professional ice hockey defenceman who is currently playing with HC Bolzano in the ICE Hockey League (ICEHL).

Playing career
On July 7, 2017, Plastino agreed to a one-year contract with HC Ambrì-Piotta of the National League (NL).

International play
Plastino competed at the 2010 and 2012 IIHF World Championships as a member of the Italy men's national ice hockey team.

References

External links

1986 births
Living people
HC Ambrì-Piotta players
Asiago Hockey 1935 players
Barrie Colts players
Bofors IK players
Bolzano HC players
Canadian ice hockey defencemen
Italian ice hockey defencemen
Örebro HK players
HC Slovan Bratislava players
Stavanger Oilers players
Tappara players
Wheeling Nailers players
Canadian sportspeople of Italian descent
Sportspeople from Sault Ste. Marie, Ontario
Canadian expatriate ice hockey players in Slovakia
Canadian expatriate ice hockey players in Norway
Canadian expatriate ice hockey players in Italy
Canadian expatriate ice hockey players in Finland
Canadian expatriate ice hockey players in Switzerland
Canadian expatriate ice hockey players in Sweden
Naturalised citizens of Italy
Canadian expatriate ice hockey players in the United States
Italian expatriate sportspeople in the United States
Italian expatriate sportspeople in Sweden
Italian expatriate sportspeople in Switzerland
Italian expatriate sportspeople in Norway
Italian expatriate sportspeople in Slovakia
Italian expatriate sportspeople in Finland
Italian expatriate ice hockey people
Naturalised sports competitors